Crook is an Old Norse surname. Notable people with the surname include:

A. R. Crook (1864–1930), American geologist
Al Crook (Alfred John Crook; 1897–1958), American football player
Alan Crook (1897–1965), Australian electrical engineer
Andrew Crook (born 1980), Australian cricketer
Anna Crook (born 1934), American politician, member of the New Mexico House of Representatives (1995–2015)
Billy Crook (disambiguation)
Carl Crook (born 1963), English amateur lightweight and professional light/light welterweight boxer
Catherine Crook de Camp (1907–2000), American science fiction author
Charles Crook (1862–1926), English teacher, trade union official and politician, Member of Parliament (1922–1923, 1924–1926)
Clive Crook (born 1953), English columnist, editor and author
Eddie Crook Jr. (1929–2005), American boxer
David Crook (1910–2000), British Marxist
David Moore Crook (1914–1944), British fighter pilot
Elizabeth Crook (born 1959), American novelist
Frances Crook (born 1952), British Labour Party politician
General Crook or General Columbus Crook (born 1945), an American blues musician
Geoffrey Crook (born 1978), English cricketer
George Crook (1828–1890), American general
George Crook (rugby union) (born 1988), English rugby union player
Gordon Crook (1921–2011), New Zealand visual artist 
Hal Crook (born 1950), jazz trombonist
Helen Crook (born 1971), British tennis player
Henry Crook (1802–1886), English first-class cricketer
Herbert Crook (born 1965), American basketball player
Howard Crook (born 1947), American tenor
Ian Crook (born 1963), former English professional football player
J. Mordaunt Crook (born 1937), British architectural historian
Jack Crook (born 1993), English basketball player
Jeff Crook, American novelist
John Crook (disambiguation), multiple people
Joseph Crook (1809–1884), Liberal British Member of Parliament (1852–1861)
Kenneth Crook (1920–2012), British politician and diplomat, Governor of the Cayman Islands (1971–1974), Ambassador to Afghanistan (1976–1979)
Lorianne Crook (born 1957), American radio and television personality
Lupen Crook (Matthew Pritchard), English musician and songwriter
Mackenzie Crook (born 1971), British actor
Malcolm Crook, professor of French history
Margaret Brackenbury Crook (1886–1972), British Unitarian minister and U.S. professor of religious studies
Martyn Crook (1956–2008), British soccer coach
Maryrose Crook, musician and artist from New Zealand
Max Crook (1936–2020), American musician
Narciso Crook (born 1995), Dominican baseball player
P. J. Crook (born 1945), British painter
Paul Crook (born 1966), American guitarist
Paul Crook (rugby league, born 1974)
Paul Crook (rugby league, born 1986)
Peter Crook (businessman) (born 1963), chief executive of Provident Financial (until 2017)
Peter Crook (born 1993), British Virgin Islander Olympic freestyle skier
Reginald Crook, 1st Baron Crook (1901–1989), British peer
Robert Crook (disambiguation)
Steven Crook (born 1983), Australian cricketer
Terry Crook (born 1947), English rugby league footballer of the 1960s, 1970s and 1980s
Thomas Crook (1798–1879), New York politician
Thurman C. Crook (1891–1981), U.S. politician
Tommy Crook (born 1944), American musician
Tony Crook (disambiguation)
Walter Crook (1912–1988), English footballer and manager
William Crook (disambiguation)

See also
Crooks (surname)

English-language surnames